Ugo Rossi (born May 29, 1963 in Milan) is an Italian politician, member of the Trentino Tyrolean Autonomist Party.

Overview
He was born in Milan where his parents had moved in the 1950s from Ossana in the Val di Sole. Ugo Rossi moved back to Trentino permanently after completing law school. Before entering politics, he worked in the insurance sector and for the company managing the Trento–Malè–Marilleva railway.

In 1999 he joined the Trentino Tyrolean Autonomist Party. In 2013 he won the Trentino provincial elections with his center-left coalition obtaining 58% of the votes. He was elected President of the Autonomous Province of Trento for a term of five years.

In 2014 he was elected president of Trentino-Alto Adige/Südtirol by the Regional Council. His term ended on 15 June 2016.

References

1963 births
Living people
Politicians from Milan
Presidents of Trentino
Members of the Regional Council of Trentino-Alto Adige